Mazhiq (in Albanian) or Mažić (in Serbian: Мажић) is a village in the municipality of Mitrovica in the District of Mitrovica, Kosovo. According to the 2011 census, it has 253 inhabitants, all Albanians.

See also
 The Mazhiqi Mosque

Notes

References 

Villages in Mitrovica, Kosovo